High-speed rail in Switzerland consists of two new lines and three new base tunnels, including the world's longest railway and deepest traffic tunnel: the Gotthard Base Tunnel whose length is .

History
To address transalpine freight and passenger bottlenecks on its roads and railways, Switzerland launched the Rail 2000 and NRLA projects.

Rail 2000 

The second stage of Rail 2000, still in project, includes line upgrades in the Valais canton and between Biel and Solothurn (also ).

NRLA project 

It includes three completed base tunnels several hundred metres below the existing apex tunnels, the  Gotthard Base Tunnel, the  Lötschberg Base Tunnel, and the  Ceneri Base Tunnel.

NRLA project is building faster north-south tracks across the Swiss Alps by constructing base tunnels several hundred metres below the level of the current tunnels. The  Lötschberg Base Tunnel opened in 2007 where New Pendolino trains run. The  Gotthard Base Tunnel opened on 1 June 2016. The  Ceneri Base Tunnel opened on 4 September 2020.

However, the slow speed of lines between the NRLA tunnels (Ceneri Base Tunnel, Gotthard Base Tunnel and Zimmerberg Base Tunnel to name but a few) means that the capacity of Zürich-Milan services will remain limited until the speeds can be increased, given the strong negative effect of mixed rail speeds on capacity.

Rolling stock

The fastest Swiss train is the SBB RABe 501 also named Giruno. It is operated by the Swiss Federal Railways since May 2016. They can reach higher speeds than conventional trains on the curve-intensive Swiss network, however the top speed of  can only be reached on high-speed lines.

The former Cisalpino consortium owned by the Swiss Federal Railways and Trenitalia used Pendolino tilting trains on two of its international lines. These trains are now operated by the Swiss Federal Railways and Trenitalia.

Network

See also
 High-speed rail in Europe
 High-speed rail in Germany
 High-speed rail in Austria
 High-speed rail in France
 High-speed rail in Italy
 Rail transport in Switzerland
 History of rail transport in Switzerland

References

High-speed rail in Switzerland